Dracula chestertonii, commonly known as the frog's skin, is a species of orchid endemic to Colombia.

It was named in honour of the collector Henry Chesterton who discovered this species.

References

 
 

chestertonii
Orchids of Colombia
Plants described in 1883